Brent R. Waters is an American computer scientist, specializing in cryptography and computer security. He is currently a professor of Computer Science at the University of Texas at Austin.

Career
Waters attended the University of California, Los Angeles, where he graduated in 2000 with a BS in computer science. He earned a PhD in computer science from Princeton University in 2004.

Waters completed his post-doctoral work at Stanford University from 2004 to 2005, hosted by Dan Boneh, and then worked at SRI International as a computer scientist until 2008. In 2008, he joined the University of Texas at Austin, where he currently holds the title of Professor in the Department of Computer Science. In July 2019, he joined NTT Research to work in their Cryptography and Information Security (CIS) Laboratory.

In 2005, Waters first proposed the concepts of attribute-based encryption and functional encryption with Amit Sahai.

Awards
Waters was awarded the Sloan Research Fellowship in 2010. In 2011, he was awarded the Presidential Early Career Award for Scientists and Engineers and a Packard Fellowship. In 2015, he was awarded the Grace Murray Hopper Award for the introduction and development of the concepts of attribute-based encryption and functional encryption. In 2019, he was named a Simons Investigator in theoretical computer science. He was elected an ACM Fellow in 2021.

Selected publications

References

External links
 Brent Waters at University of Texas
 

Living people
American cryptographers
Computer security specialists
Modern cryptographers
American computer scientists
University of California, Los Angeles alumni
Princeton University alumni
University of Texas at Austin faculty
Grace Murray Hopper Award laureates
Simons Investigator
Year of birth missing (living people)